Simon John Edge (born 25 December 1964 in Chester, England) is a British novelist and journalist.

Educated at the King's School, Chester, he went on to receive a master's degree in Philosophy from St Catharine's College, Cambridge and has a master's degree in Creative Writing from City University, where he also taught as a visiting lecturer.

He got his first job in journalism at the Middle East business magazine MEED and went on to be the final editor of Capital Gay. He was on staff at the London Evening Standard and joined the Daily Express in 1999, where he spent many years as a feature writer and theatre critic. He is a former senior contributing editor of Attitude magazine.

He is the author of With Friends Like These, a critique of the Left's record on gay rights.

Edge has written five novels, all published by Lightning Books. His first novel, The Hopkins Conundrum (2017), was based on the life of poet Gerard Manley Hopkins. It was described by The Spectator as "a pleasurable literary thriller [in which] Edge wears his Hopkins learning lightly," and by the Daily Express as "enjoyable on every level." It was longlisted for the Waverton Good Read Award 2017–18. His second novel, The Hurtle of Hell (2018), was inspired by scientific research into what happens in the brain during a near-death experience. His third, A Right Royal Face-Off (2019), is a comic novel based on the life of painter Thomas Gainsborough, and has been described by Gainsborough authority Hugh Belsey as "beguiling" and "beautifully managed and brilliantly resolved." His fourth novel, Anyone for Edmund? (2020), imagines the rediscovery of the body of Edmund the Martyr, England's lost patron saint. The i (newspaper) said "Edge's sharp-edged political comedy is guaranteed to have you laughing out loud". His fifth novel, The End of the World is Flat (2021), was blurbed by Francis Wheen as a "bracingly sharp satire on the sleep of reason and the tyranny of twaddle." The Times called it "nifty, often snort-inducingly funny satire".

Edge was married to Ezio Alessandroni, a former Roman Catholic priest, until the latter's death from cancer in March 2017.

References

External links 
 Official website

1964 births
Living people
British male journalists
British theatre critics
People from Chester
English gay writers
English LGBT writers
Alumni of St Catharine's College, Cambridge
Alumni of City, University of London
20th-century British writers
21st-century British writers
20th-century British male writers